Diggstown is a Canadian legal drama television series created by Floyd Kane. The first Canadian drama series to feature a Black Canadian woman as its lead character, the series stars Vinessa Antoine as Marcie Diggs, a lawyer who leaves her high-powered corporate job to work for a legal aid clinic in Dartmouth, Nova Scotia, after her aunt commits suicide.

The first season premiered on CBC Television on March 6, 2019. A second season was announced in May 2019, following the conclusion of the first season. On June 21, 2020, the series was renewed for a third season which is set to premiere on October 6, 2021. In early 2021, Fox picked up the series for distribution.

The CBC announced in October 2022 that the show's fourth season will be its last, with the finale scheduled to air on November 16.

Plot 
Diggstown follows Marcie Diggs (Antoine), a star corporate lawyer who reconsiders her priorities and moves to work in a legal-aid office after her beloved aunt takes her own life following the pressures of a malicious prosecution.

Cast
Vinessa Antoine as Marcie Diggs
Natasha Henstridge as Colleen MacDonnell
C. David Johnson as Reggie Thompson
Stacey Farber as Pam MacLean
Brandon Oakes as Doug Paul
Shailene Garnett as Iris Beals
Tim Rozon as Constable Carson Myers
Dwain Murphy as Avery Mueller 
Mpho Koaho as Percy Lincoln
Kim Roberts  as Ona Reeves

Episodes

Season 1 (2019)

Season 2 (2020)

Season 3 (2021)

Season 4 (2022)

International release
BET+ acquired U.S. streaming rights to the series in April 2020. Fox acquired the U.S. television broadcast rights for the series in January 2021.

Reception
The series has received positive reviews. The Globe and Mail called the series "a charming, no-glitz legal drama".

References

External links 

2010s Canadian drama television series
2020s Canadian drama television series
2019 Canadian television series debuts
2022 Canadian television series endings
2010s Black Canadian television series
2020s Black Canadian television series
Canadian legal television series
CBC Television original programming
Television shows set in Nova Scotia
Television shows filmed in Halifax, Nova Scotia
Television series by DHX Media
Television series by Entertainment One